Benny Luke (March 4, 1939 in Oakland, California – January 13, 2013) was an American-French actor and dancer established in Paris.

He is best known for playing the role of Jacob, the domestic of Renato and Albin in the trilogy of films La Cage Aux Folles. He also had a role in the film Spermula.

As a dancer, he mainly made his career in Parisian cabarets.

He died on 13 January 2013 and was cremated at Père-Lachaise cemetery on 17 January.

Filmography

References

External links 
 

Male actors from Oakland, California
American male actors
American male dancers
2013 deaths
1942 births
American expatriates in France